Andrew Mackie is an Australian film distributor, producer and author. He is a co-founder of Australian film distribution company Transmission Films along with Richard Payten.

Career

Mackie founded the Australian film distribution company Transmission Films with Richard Payten in 2008. 
Prior to Transmission Mackie and Payten were joint general managers of Dendy Films and The Globe Film Co. He and Payten have released over 180 films generating over $400 million at the box office. Films Mackie has acquired and distributed have won 9 Palme d’Ors, been nominated for 51 Academy Awards and received over 220 AACTA nominations. As a film distributor he has released films such as The King's Speech, Lion, Amour, Samson & Delilah, The Railway Man, Calvary, Shame, Ride Like A Girl and many more.

As a producer he has executive produced a number of films including Ride Like A Girl directed by Rachel Griffiths, Holding the Man directed by Neil Armfield, Mary & Max directed by Adam Elliot, Candy directed by Neil Armfield, The Eye of the Storm directed by Fred Schepisi, Tracks directed by John Curran, the UK/Australian co-production Oyster Farmer directed by Anna Reeves, On Chesil Beach directed by Dominic Cooke, Sweet Country directed by Warwick Thornton and Strangerland directed by Kim Farrant starring Nicole Kidman.

Mackie and Payten were also founding partners in See-Saw Films, the Oscar-winning UK/Australian production company behind The King's Speech and Shame.

In 2012 and 2013, The Australian, an Australian newspaper named Andrew Mackie as one of the most influential people in the Australian arts. In 2003 Mackie was named as one of The Hollywood Reporters Next Gen Under 35 executives.

Mackie is a current board member of Screen Canberra and the Adelaide Film Festival.

In 2021 his first novel, The Tour, was published by Penguin Random House Australia.

Filmography

As Executive Producer
Juniper (2021)
Six Minutes to Midnight (2021)
The Very Excellent Mr Dundee (2020)
Ride Like A Girl (2019)
That's Not My Dog! (2018)
On Chesil Beach (2017)
Sweet Country (2017)
David Stratton's Stories of Australian Cinema (2017)
Lion: The Journey Home (2017)
One Thousand Ropes (2016)
Whiteley (2017)
 Holding the Man (2015)
Strangerland (2015)
Tracks (2013)
The Eye of the Storm (2011)
Charlie & Boots (2009)
Mary and Max (2009)
Candy (2006)
Oyster Farmer (2004)

As Film Distributor

The King's Speech
Lion
Ride Like a Girl
The Nightingale
I Am Woman
Danger Close
Ammonite
Tea With The Dames
Red Joan
Viceroy's House
Top of the Lake
Last Flag Flying
Suspiria
At Eternity's Gate
Collette
The True History of the Kelly Gang
Military Wives
The Book Shop
Book Club
Amour
Samson & Delilah
The Railway Man
Calvary
Shame
Tracks
Mr. Turner
Holding the Man
Suffragette
Carol
Brooklyn
Boy
The Painted Veil
Quartet
Beneath Hill 60
An Education
Mr. Holmes
Le Week-End
Blue is the Warmest Colour
20 Feet From Stardom
Control
The White Ribbon
Charlie & Boots
Antichrist
The World's Fastest Indian
Good Night And Good Luck
The Guard
Volver
Secrets & Lies
Swimming Pool
Fish Tank
Super Size Me
Rabbit Proof Fence

References

External links
 

Living people
Australian film producers
Film distributors of Australia
Place of birth missing (living people)
Year of birth missing (living people)